Elections to Ayrshire County Council were held on 10 May 1955. The Local Government (Scotland) Act 1889 established Ayrshire as an administrative county, governed by a County Council.

Following the election the council was composed of 25 Labourites, 16 Progressives/Moderates, and an Independent. The former council had composed 24 Labourites, 15 Progressives/Moderates, and an Independent. Due to the splitting of several larger divisions 3 new seats had to be filled.

Aggregate results

Results by division

References

Notes

1955 Scottish local elections
Politics of Ayrshire